La Favorite is an upcoming French biographical film written and directed by Maïwenn and starring Johnny Depp, Maïwenn, Louis Garrel, Pierre Richard, and Noémie Lvovsky. The film is set to have its world premiere at the 2023 Cannes Film Festival in May 2023, before being theatrically released in France in 2023 by Netflix, before its streaming release 15 months afterwards.

Cast
 Johnny Depp as Louis XV
 Maïwenn as Madame du Barry
 Louis Garrel
 Pierre Richard
 Noémie Lvovsky
 Benjamin Lavernhe
 Melvil Poupaud
 Pascal Greggory
 India Hair

Development
In January 2022, Johnny Depp was cast as King Louis XV in French actor-director Maïwenn's period film Jeanne Du Barry. In May 2022, Louis Garrel, Pierre Richard, and Noémie Lvovsky were cast in undisclosed roles, while Wild Bunch sold the film for distribution during the 2022 Cannes Film Festival. By July 2022, the film, retitled La Favorite, was revealed to have been acted in French, with Netflix handling distribution in France. By July 2022, Benjamin Lavernhe, Melvil Poupaud, Pascal Greggory, and India Hair were cast.

Principal photography commenced on July 26, 2022, in Versailles and other regions of Paris, for 11 weeks. Filming wrapped in mid-October 2022. The film was financed by the Red Sea International Film Festival.

Release
La Favorite is set to have its world premiere at the 2023 Cannes Film Festival in May 2023, before being theatrically released in France later in the year by Netflix, following its debut on the service 15 months afterwards.

References

External links 
 

2020s biographical drama films
2020s French-language films
2020s historical drama films
2023 films
2023 independent films
Cultural depictions of Louis XV
Cultural depictions of Madame du Barry
Films directed by Maïwenn
Films set in Paris
Films shot in Paris
French biographical drama films
French historical drama films
French-language Netflix original films
Upcoming Netflix original films
Upcoming films
2020s French films